Ragozinka is a meteorite crater in the Urals in Russia.

It is 9 km in diameter and the age is estimated to be 46 ± 3 million years old (Eocene). The crater is not exposed at the surface.

References 

Impact craters of Russia
Eocene impact craters
Lutetian Stage
Landforms of Sverdlovsk Oblast